Jayron Todd Hosley (born September 18, 1990) is a former American football cornerback who played for the New York Giants of the National Football League (NFL). He played college football at Virginia Tech.

High school career
He attended Atlantic Community High School in Delray Beach, Florida, where he was a teammate of Orlando Franklin and Karnell Hatcher. Regarded as a four-star recruit by Rivals.com, Hosley was ranked as the No. 11 cornerback prospect of his class.

College career
As a sophomore in 2010, Hosley recorded 39 tackles, seven pass breakups, and nation leading nine interceptions. This performance earned him first-team All-American honors from Scout.com and Walter Camp Football Foundation.

Professional career
Hosley was drafted with the 94th pick, in the third round of the 2012 NFL Draft by the Giants. He recorded his first interception on September 20, 2012 on a pass by Carolina Panthers quarterback Cam Newton.

References

External links
NFL Combine bio
Virginia Tech Hokies bio

1990 births
Living people
American football cornerbacks
Virginia Tech Hokies football players
New York Giants players
Sportspeople from Delray Beach, Florida
Sportspeople from Boynton Beach, Florida